Aciphylla anomala is a species of flowering plant in the family Apiaceae. It is endemic to New Zealand. It was formally described by botanist Harry Allan in his 1961 work Flora of New Zealand. The type was collected on Mount Peel.

The plant grows as tall spikey leaves that are surrounded by rosettes of stiff, pointed leaves lacking stipules, with a variable number of leaflets per leaf. It disperses its seeds via winged schizocarps. Aciphylla polita is somewhat similar in appearance, but can be distinguished by its more dense inflorescence. The specific epithet is derived from the Ancient Greek anōmalía, meaning "unusual".

References

Apioideae
Endemic flora of New Zealand
Plants described in 1961
Taxa named by Harry Allan